Teresa Barbara Ciepły (née Wieczorek; 19 October 1937 – 8 March 2006) was a Polish sprinter and hurdler. She was a bronze Olympic medalist in the 4×100 metre relay at the 1960 Summer Olympics. Two years later she won gold medals in the 4 × 100 m relay (in European record time of 44.5 seconds) and the 80 m hurdles, and a bronze medal in the 100 m sprint at the 1962 European Championships. The same year she was chosen as the Polish Sportspersonality of the year. At the 1964 Olympics she won a gold medal in the 4 × 100 m relay, in a world record time of 43.6 seconds, and a silver in the 80 m hurdles. Nationally Ciepły won the Polish titles in the 80 m hurdles (1961–62, 1964–1965) and in the 100 m sprint (1960–1962).

Shortly after the 1960 Olympics she married Olgierd Ciepły, an Olympic hammer thrower. In retirement Ciepły worked as a clerk and an athletics coach in Bydgoszcz. After her death, a secondary school there was named in her honor.

References

External links

  Teresa Ciepły at http://www.sporting-heroes.net
 A full listing of the women's medals won at the 1962 European Championship
 Website about Teresa Ciepły (amateur) (en, pl)

1937 births
2006 deaths
People from Łask County
Sportspeople from Łódź Voivodeship
Polish female hurdlers
Polish female sprinters
Olympic athletes of Poland
Olympic gold medalists for Poland
Olympic silver medalists for Poland
Olympic bronze medalists for Poland
Athletes (track and field) at the 1960 Summer Olympics
Athletes (track and field) at the 1964 Summer Olympics
Medalists at the 1960 Summer Olympics
Medalists at the 1964 Summer Olympics
European Athletics Championships medalists
World record setters in athletics (track and field)
Olympic gold medalists in athletics (track and field)
Olympic silver medalists in athletics (track and field)
Olympic bronze medalists in athletics (track and field)
Zawisza Bydgoszcz athletes
People from Bydgoszcz